The Plan Belgrano, named after Manuel Belgrano, is an infrastructure plan for the northern Argentine provinces, announced in 2015 by president Mauricio Macri.

Announcement
Macri has announced an infrastructure development strategy named Plan Belgrano (after Manuel Belgrano), a plan aimed at building infrastructure and encouraging industry development in ten of Argentina's northern provinces, which have historically lagged behind the rest of the country. The plan includes a proposed investment equivalent to 16 billion United States dollars over the course of 10 years, along with an "historical reconstruction fund" of 50 billion pesos to be used in 4 years. Other objectives of the plan include the provision of housing for some 250,000 families, and the construction of 1,400 child care centers.

References

Presidency of Mauricio Macri
2015 establishments in Argentina
Economic history of Argentina